Stan Wojewodski Jr. is an American professor, director, and was Chair of the Theatre Division at Southern Methodist UniversityMeadows School of the Arts from 2010 to 2018.

References

External links
 How An Accidental Texan Found Artistic Shelter Under Main Street

Southern Methodist University faculty
Living people
Year of birth missing (living people)